The United States Fish and Wildlife Service (USFWS or FWS) is an agency within the United States Department of the Interior dedicated to the management of fish, wildlife, and natural habitats. The mission of the agency is "working with others to conserve, protect, and enhance fish, wildlife, plants and their habitats for the continuing benefit of the American people."

Among the responsibilities of the USFWS are enforcing federal wildlife laws; protecting endangered species; managing migratory birds; restoring nationally significant fisheries; conserving and restoring wildlife habitats, such as wetlands; helping foreign governments in international conservation efforts; and distributing money to fish and wildlife agencies of U.S. states through the Wildlife Sport Fish and Restoration Program. The vast majority of fish and wildlife habitats are on state or private land not controlled by the United States government. Therefore, the USFWS works closely with private groups such as Partners in Flight and the Sport Fishing and Boating Partnership Council to promote voluntary habitat conservation and restoration.

The agency's directorship is currently led by Martha Williams. President Joe Biden appointed her to the position on March 8, 2022. She was previously the director of the Montana Department of Fish, Wildlife and Parks.

The USFWS employs approximately 8,000 people and is organized into a central administrative office in Falls Church, Virginia, eight regional offices, and nearly 700 field offices distributed throughout the United States.

Activities

National Wildlife Refuge System
The USFWS manages the National Wildlife Refuge System, which consists of 560 National Wildlife Refuges, encompassing a full range of habitat types, including wetlands, prairies, coastal and marine areas, and temperate, tundra, and boreal forests spread across all 50 U.S. states.

National Monuments
The USFWS governs six National Monuments:

 The Hanford Reach National Monument in Washington state; 
 The Papahānaumokuākea Marine National Monument, a huge maritime area in the Northwestern Hawaiian Islands, managed jointly with the National Oceanic and Atmospheric Administration (NOAA) and the State of Hawaii); 
 The Aleutian Islands World War II National Monument in the Aleutian Islands in Alaska; 
 The Pacific Remote Islands Marine National Monument, the largest marine protected area in the world, managed in consultation with NOAA; 
 The Rose Atoll Marine National Monument in American Samoa, managed jointly with NOAA and the Government of American Samoa; and 
 The Marianas Trench Marine National Monument, which includes undersea mud volcanoes, vents, chemosynthetic organisms, and many of the deepest points on Earth, managed in coordination with NOAA

Endangered species
The USFWS shares the responsibility for administering the Endangered Species Act of 1973 with the National Marine Fisheries Service (NMFS), an element of NOAA, with the NMFS responsible for marine species, the FWS responsible for freshwater fish and all other species, and the two organizations jointly managing species that occur in both marine and non-marine environments. The USFWS publishes the quarterly Endangered Species Bulletin.

National Fish Hatchery System
The USFWS's Fisheries Program oversees the National Fish Hatchery System (NFHS), which includes 70 National Fish Hatcheries and 65 Fish and Wildlife Conservation Offices. Originally created to reverse declines in lake and coastal fish stocks in the United States, the NFHS subsequently expanded its mission to include the preservation of the genes of wild and hatchery-raised fish; the restoration of native aquatic populations of fish, freshwater mussels, and amphibians including populations of species listed under the Endangered Species Act; mitigating the loss of fisheries resulting from U.S. Government water projects; and providing fish to benefit Native Americans and National Wildlife Refuges. The NFHS also engages in outreach, education, and research activities.

Migratory Bird Program
The Division of Migratory Bird Management runs the Migratory Bird Program, which works with partners of the USFWS to protect, restore, and conserve bird populations and their habitats by ensuring the long-term ecological sustainability of all migratory bird populations, increasing the socioeconomic benefit of birds, improving the experience of hunting, bird watching, and other outdoor activities related to birds, and increasing the awareness of the aesthetic, ecological, recreational and economic significance of migratory birds and their habitats. It conducts surveys; coordinates USFWS activities with those of public-private bird conservation partnerships; provides matching grants for conservation efforts involving USFWS partners; develops policies and regulations and administers conservation laws related to migratory birds; issues permits to allow individuals and organizations to participate in migratory bird conservation efforts; helps educate and engage children in wildlife conservation topics; and provides resources for parents and educators to assist them in helping children explore nature and birds.

Landscape Conservation Cooperatives
The USFWS partners with the  Landscape Conservation Cooperatives, a network of 22 autonomous cooperatives sponsored by the Department of the Interior which function as regional conservation bodies covering the entire United States and adjacent areas.

Law enforcement

Office of Law Enforcement
The United States Fish and Wildlife Service Office of Law Enforcement enforces wildlife laws, investigates wildlife crimes, regulates wildlife trade, helps people in the United States understand and obey wildlife protection laws, and works in partnership with international, state, and tribal counterparts to conserve wildlife resources. It also trains other U.S. Government, U.S. state, tribal, and foreign law enforcement officers.

Clark R. Bavin National Fish and Wildlife Forensic Laboratory
The USFWS operates the Clark R. Bavin National Fish and Wildlife Forensic Laboratory, the only forensics laboratory in the world devoted to wildlife law enforcement. By treaty, it also is the official crime laboratory for the Convention on International Trade in Endangered Species of Wild Fauna and Flora (CITES) and the Wildlife Group of Interpol. The laboratory identifies the species or subspecies of pieces, parts, or products of an animal to determine its cause of death, help wildlife officers determine if a violation of law occurred in its death, and to identify and compare physical evidence to link suspects to the crime scene and the animal's death.

Division of Refuge Law Enforcement
United States Fish and Wildlife Service Refuge Law Enforcement consists of professional law enforcement officers entrusted with protecting natural resources and public safety.
Federal Wildlife Officers promote the survival of species and health of the environment by ensuring that wildlife laws are followed. They also welcome visitors and are often the first U.S. Fish and Wildlife Service employees encountered by the public on refuges.  Federal Wildlife Officers (FWO) are entrusted with protecting natural resources, visitors and employees on National Wildlife Refuge System lands.

Federal Duck Stamp

The USFWS issues an annual Federal Duck Stamp, a collectable adhesive stamp required to hunt for migratory waterfowl. It also allows access to National Wildlife Refuges without paying an admission fee.

International Affairs Program
The USFWS International Affairs Program coordinates domestic and international efforts to protect, restore, and enhance wildlife and its habitats, focusing on species of international concern, fulfilling the USFWS's international responsibilities under about 40 treaties, as well as U.S. laws and regulations. It oversees programs which work with private citizens, local communities, other U.S. Government and U.S. state agencies, foreign governments, non-governmental organizations, scientific and conservation organizations, industry groups. and other interested parties on issues related to the implementation of treaties and laws and the conservation of species around the world.

National Conservation Training Center
The USFWS's National Conservation Training Center trains USFWS employees and those of USFWS partners in the accomplishment of the USFWS's mission.

Tribal relations
Pursuant to the eagle feather law, Title 50, Part 22 of the Code of Federal Regulations (50 CFR 22), and the Bald and Golden Eagle Protection Act, the USFWS administers the National Eagle Repository and the permit system for Native American religious use of eagle feathers. These exceptions often only apply to Native Americans that are registered with the federal government and are enrolled with a federally recognized tribe.

In the late 1990s and early 2000s, the USFWS began to incorporate the research of tribal scientists into conservation decisions. This came on the heels of Native American traditional ecological knowledge (TEK) gaining acceptance in the scientific community as a reasonable and respectable way to gain knowledge of managing the natural world. Additionally, other natural resource agencies within the United States government, such as the United States Department of Agriculture, have taken steps to be more inclusive of tribes, native people, and tribal rights. This has marked a transition to a relationship of more co-operation rather than the tension between tribes and government agencies seen historically. Today, these agencies work closely with tribal governments to ensure the best conservation decisions are made and that tribes retain their sovereignty.

History

Ancestor organizations

Fish Commission and Bureau of Fisheries
The original ancestor of USFWS was the United States Commission on Fish and Fisheries, more commonly referred to as the United States Fish Commission, created in 1871 by the United States Congress with the purpose of studying and recommending solutions to a noted decline in the stocks of food fish. Spencer Fullerton Baird was appointed to lead it as the first United States Commissioner of Fisheries. In 1903, the Fish Commission was reorganized as the United States Bureau of Fisheries and made part of the United States Department of Commerce and Labor. When the Department of Commerce and Labor was split into the United States Department of Commerce and the United States Department of Labor in 1913, the Bureau of Fisheries was made part of the Department of Commerce. Originally focused on fisheries science and fish culture, the Bureau of Fisheries also assumed other duties; in 1906, the U.S. Congress assigned it the responsibility for the enforcement of fishery and fur seal-hunting regulations in the Territory of Alaska, and in 1910 for the management and harvest of northern fur seals, foxes, and other fur-bearing animals in the Pribilof Islands, as well as for the care, education, and welfare of the Aleut communities in the islands. In 1939, the Bureau of Fisheries moved from the Department of Commerce to the Department of the Interior.

Bureau of Biological Survey
The other ancestor of the USFWS began as the Section of Economic Ornithology, which was established within the United States Department of Agriculture in 1885 and became the Division of Economic Ornithology and Mammalogy in 1886. In 1896 it became the Division of Biological Survey. Clinton Hart Merriam headed the Division for 25 years and became a national figure for improving the scientific understanding of birds and mammals in the United States.

In 1934, the Division of Biological Survey was reorganized as the Bureau of Biological Survey and Jay Norwood Darling was appointed its chief;. The same year, Congress passed the Fish and Wildlife Coordination Act (FWCA), one of the oldest federal environmental review statutes. Under Darling's guidance, the Bureau began an ongoing legacy of protecting vital natural habitat throughout the United States. In 1939, the Bureau of Biological Survey moved from the Department of Agriculture to the Department of the Interior.

Fish and Wildlife Service

On June 30, 1940, the Bureau of Fisheries and the Bureau of Biological Survey were combined to form the Department of the Interior's Fish and Wildlife Service. In 1956, the Fish and Wildlife Service was reorganized as the United States Fish and Wildlife Service — which remained part of the Department of the Interior — and divided its operations into two bureaus, the Bureau of Sport Fisheries and Wildlife and the Bureau of Commercial Fisheries, with the latter inheriting the history and heritage of the old U.S. Fish Commission and U.S. Bureau of Fisheries.

Upon the formation of the National Oceanic and Atmospheric Administration (NOAA) within the Department of Commerce on October 3, 1970, the Bureau of Commercial Fisheries merged with the salt-water laboratories of the Bureau of Sport Fisheries and Wildlife to form today's National Marine Fisheries Service (NMFS), an element of NOAA.  The remainder of the USFWS remained in place in the Department of the Interior in 1970 as the foundation of the USFWS as it is known today, although in 1985 the Animal Damage Control Agency, responsible for predator control, was transferred from the USFWS to the Department of Agriculture and renamed the Division of Wildlife Services.

Mission 
At its founding in 1896, the work of the Division of Biological Survey focused on the effect of birds in controlling agricultural pests and mapping the geographical distribution of plants and animals in the United States. By 1905 with funding scarce, the Survey included in its mission the eradication of wolves, coyotes and other large predators.  This garnered them the support of ranchers and western legislators resulting, by 1914, in a $125,000 congressionally approved budget for use "on the National Forests and the public domain in destroying wolves, coyotes and other animals injurious to agriculture and animal husbandry". Meanwhile, scientists like Joseph Grinnell and Charles C. Adams, a founder of the Ecological Society of America, were promoting a "balance of nature" theory - the idea that predators were an important part of the larger ecosystem and should not be eradicated.  In 1924, at a conference organized by the American Society of Mammologists (ASM), the debate generated a public split between those in the Survey, promoting eradication, and those from the ASM who promoted some sort of accommodation.  Edward A. Goldman, from the Survey, made perfectly clear their position in a paper  that with the arrival of Europeans in North America, the balance of nature had been "violently overturned, never to be reestablished".  He concludes with the idea that "Large predatory mammals, destructive to livestock and to game, no longer have a place in our advancing civilization."  The Survey subsequently placed over 2 million poisoned bait stations across the west and by 1930 had "extirpated wolves from the Lower 48 and advised and assisted in erasing grey wolves from" Yellowstone and Glacier National Parks.  The Survey then turned to the eradication of coyotes. [pp. 124–126], coordinated through the 1931 Animal Damage Control Act.

With various agency reorganizations, the practice continued more or less apace through the early 1970s but though hundreds of thousands of coyotes were killed, their extreme adaptability and resilience led to little overall population reduction and, instead, their migration into an expanded habitat, including urban areas.  Increasing environmental awareness in the late 1960s and early 1970s resulted in Nixon banning post WWII era poisons in 1972 and the passage of the Endangered Species Act in 1973.  Also in 1972, the Nixon administration rewrote the Animal Damage Control Act, effectively repealing it in favor of turning the mission of predator control over to the states.  However, the loss of federally fund to protect their livestock was too much for ranching and agricultural communities and by 1980 Reagan had reversed the poison killing ban and transferred the responsibility for predator control to the Wildlife Services program under the US Department of Agriculture's Animal and Plant Health Inspection Service.  The Program's mission has evolved to protect "agriculture, wildlife and other natural resources, property, and human health and safety".

Fleet 
From 1940 to 1970, the FWS (from 1956 the USFWS) operated a fleet of seagoing vessels. The fleet included fisheries science research ships, fishery patrol vessels, and cargo liners.
 
The Fish Commission operated a small fleet of research ships and fish-culture vessels. The Bureau of Fisheries inherited these in 1903, and then greatly expanded its fleet of seagoing vessels, including both patrol vessels for fishery enforcement in the Territory of Alaska and a cargo liner — known as the "Pribilof tender" — to provide transportation for passengers and haul cargo to, from, and between the Pribilof Islands. In the 1930s, the Bureau of Biological Survey operated a vessel of its own, Brown Bear. Upon its creation in 1940, the FWS inherited the BOF's fleet and Brown Bear.

By 1940, no fisheries research vessels remained in commission, the BOF having decommissioned the last one, in 1932; only in the late 1940s did the FWS begin to commission new research ships. Although between 1871 and 1940 the Fish Commission and BOF had never had more than three fisheries research ships in commission at the same time — and had three in commission simultaneously only in two years out of their entire combined history — by March 1950, the FWS fleet included 11 seagoing fisheries research and exploratory fishing vessels either in service or under construction, and its fishery enforcement force in the Territory of Alaska included 29 patrol vessels and about 100 speedboats, as well as 20 airplanes. In the 1956 reorganization that created the USFWS, the Bureau of Commercial Fisheries (BCF) assumed the responsibility within the USFWS for the operation of the seagoing vessels of the fleet.

The USFWS continued fishery enforcement in Alaska until after Alaska became a state in January 1959, but by 1960 had turned over enforcement responsibilities and some of the associated vessels to the Government of Alaska as the latter assumed the responsibility for fishery enforcement in its waters. The USFWS continued to operate fisheries research ships and the Pribilof tender until the BCF's seagoing fleet was transferred to the National Marine Fisheries Service (NMFS), an element of NOAA, upon the creation of NOAA on October 3, 1970. Although the NMFS continued to operate the Pribilof tender until 1975, the rest of the ships were transferred from the NMFS to a unified NOAA fleet during 1972 and 1973. The modern NOAA fleet therefore traces its ancestry in part to the USFWS fleet operated by the BCF.

Both before and after the FWS became the USFWS in 1956, ships of its fleet used the prefix  while in commission. The BOF usually named its ships after aquatic birds, and ships the FWS inherited from the BOF in 1940 retained those names in FWS service. However, the FWS/USFWS thereafter usually named vessels it acquired after people who were notable in the history of fisheries and fisheries science. A partial list of ships of the FWS and USFWS fleet:

 (research vessel, 1948–1959)
 (research vessel, USFWS 1963–1970, then NOAA 1970–2008)
 (patrol vessel, BOF 1917–1940, then FWS 1940–1950)
 (patrol vessel, BOF 1924–1940, then FWS 1940–1950s)
 (patrol vessel, BOF 1926–1940, then FWS 1940–1953)
US FWS Brown Bear (research vessel, Bureau of Biological Survey 1934–1940, then FWS 1940–1942, USFWS 1965–1970, NMFS 1970–1972)
 (research vessel, FWS/USFWS 1952–1970, then NOAA 1970–1973)
 (patrol vessel, BOF 1928–1940, then FWS/USFWS 1940–1960)
 (research vessel, USFWS 1966–1970, then NOAA 1970–2010)
 (research vessel, USFWS 1968–1970, then NOAA 1970–2012)
 (Pribilof tender and cargo liner, 1948–1960)
 (Pribilof tender and patrol vessel, BOF 1919–1940, then FWS 1940–1942 and 1946–late 1940s)
 (research vessel 1962–1970, then NOAA 1970–1980)
 (research vessel 1949–1951)
 (research vessel 1949–1959)
 (research vessel FWS/USFWS 1950–1970, then NOAA 1970–2008)
 (research vessel 1950–1969)
 (patrol vessel, BOF 1919–1940, then FWS 1940–late 1940s)
 (patrol vessel, BOF 1919–1940, then FWS 1940–ca. 1942–1943)
 (research vessel USFWS 1967–1970, then NOAA 1975–2013)
 (patrol vessel, BOF 1917–1940, then FWS 1940–1942)
 (research vessel FWS/USFWS 1949–1970, then NOAA 1970–1989)
 (research vessel FWS/USFWS 1956–1970, then NOAA 1970–1980)
 (research and patrol vessel, BOF 1930–1940, then FWS/USFWS 1940–1958, NMFS ca. 1970/1971 to 1972)
 (Pribilof tender, BOF 1930–1940, then FWS 1940–1950)
 (Pribilof tender, 1950–1963)
 (Pribilof tender USFWS 1963–1970,then NMFS 1970–1975)
 (patrol vessel, BOF 1922–1940, then FWS 1940–1949)
 (patrol vessel, BOF 1928–1940, then FWS/USFWS 1940–1960)
 (research vessel 1964–1975, then NOAA 1975–2002)
 (patrol vessel, BOF 1919–1940, then FWS 1940–ca. 1944–1945)

In popular culture
In 1959, the methods used by USFWS's Animal Damage Control Program were featured in the Tom Lehrer song "Poisoning Pigeons in the Park."

See also

 Federal law enforcement in the United States

Related governmental agencies
 Atlantic Coastal Cooperative Statistics Program
 National Fish and Wildlife Forensics Laboratory
 National Marine Fisheries Service
 National Oceanic and Atmospheric Administration
 National Oceanic and Atmospheric Administration Fisheries Office of Law Enforcement
 National Park Service
 Partners for Fish and Wildlife
 United States Coast Guard
 United States Geological Survey

Regulatory matters
 Coastal Barrier Resources Act
 Endangered Species Act
 Fish and Wildlife Coordination Act
 Lacey Act
 Listing priority number
 Marine Mammal Protection Act
 Migratory Bird Treaty Act
 Migratory Bird Treaty Act of 1918
 National Wetlands Inventory
 National Wildlife Refuge System Administration Act of 1966
 Ramsar Wetlands Convention
 Sikes Act
 The Convention on International Trade in Endangered Species of Wild Flora and Fauna (CITES)
 Wild Bird Conservation Act of 1992

Wildlife management
 Convention on International Trade in Endangered Species of Wild Fauna and Flora
 International Migratory Bird Day
 Sierra Club v. Babbitt
 Timeline of environmental events
 Tri-State Bird Rescue and Research
 United States Fish and Wildlife Service list of endangered species

Other related topics
 Arizona Game and Fish Department
 National Survey of Fishing, Hunting, and Wildlife-Associated Recreation
 National Wildlife Refuge Association
 North American Game Warden Museum

Notes
1.  USFWS headquarters has a Falls Church, Virginia, US mailing address.

References

Footnotes

Bibliography
 Day, Albert M., "The Fish and Wildlife Service — Ten Years of Progress," Commercial Fisheries Review, March 1950, p. 1.

Further reading
 US fishery agency Annual Reports 1871-1940 and 1947-1979
 Director of US Fish and Wildlife Service dies at Keystone
 DOI Secretary Ken Salazar's Statement on the Passing of Fish and Wildlife Service Director Sam Hamilton

External links

 
 US Fish and Wildlife Service on Google Cultural Institute
 Fish and Wildlife Service in the Federal Register
 FWS Midwest Region
 FWS Southwest Region
 Lower Great Lakes Fishery Resources Office
 Technical Report Archive and Image Library (TRAIL) Historic technical reports from the Fish and Wildlife Service (and other Federal agencies)

 
Environmental agencies in the United States
Fish and Wildlife Service
Nature conservation in the United States
Land management in the United States
United States public land law
Wildfire suppression agencies
Government agencies established in 1940
1940 establishments in the United States
1940 in the environment
Fish and Wildlife